"(I'm Gonna) Love Me Again" is a song from the 2019 biopic Rocketman. Written by Elton John and Bernie Taupin, the song was performed by John and Taron Egerton, who portrayed John in the film. The song is heard in the end credits of the film. The official music video features both archival clips from John's early career as well as scenes from the film. The song won numerous accolades including "Best Original Song" at the 77th Golden Globe Awards, "Best Song" at the 25th Critics' Choice Awards, "Best Original Song" at the 24th Satellite Awards, and Best Original Song at the 92nd Academy Awards.

The song premiered on BBC Radio 2 on 16 May 2019.

Accolades

Music video
The music video was directed by Kii Arens. It was uploaded to John's official Vevo account on 13 June 2019. The video features John and Egerton, with footage of Egerton as John in Rocketman, archival footage of the musician and clips of both John and Egerton recording the song in the studio. It also includes kaleidoscopic animation mixed with album artwork and concert posters from John's heyday.

The making of the music video was released on 4 July 2019 on John's Vevo account, with John and Taupin discussing the track in a behind-the-scenes video.

Live performances
"(I'm Gonna) Love Me Again" was performed by John and Egerton on Paramount Pictures' Rocketman: Live in Concert at the Greek Theatre, in Los Angeles, with the Hollywood Symphony Orchestra on 17 October 2019.

John performed "(I'm Gonna) Love Me Again" at the 92nd Academy Awards on 9 February 2020 with a red Yamaha piano and full-band including backing singers in front of a screen with animated graphics to represent the film. The song won the Academy Award for Best Original Song.

Remix
DJ Purple Disco Machine was responsible for a remix version of music from John and Egerton. The music was launched on download and streaming platforms on 19 December 2019. The cover of the remix was illustrated by Erin Goedtel.

Track listing
Digital download
 "(I'm Gonna) Love Me Again" (Purple Disco Machine Remix) – 3:25

Charts

Weekly charts

Year-end charts

Release history

References

External links
 

2019 singles
2019 songs
2010s ballads
Elton John songs
Songs with music by Elton John
Songs with lyrics by Bernie Taupin
Songs written for films
Song recordings produced by Greg Kurstin
Male vocal duets
Best Original Song Academy Award-winning songs
Best Original Song Golden Globe winning songs
Virgin EMI Records singles
Interscope Records singles